Elli Pikkujämsä (born 24 October 1999) is a Finnish footballer who plays as a defender for Racing Louisville FC and the Finland women's national football team.

Career
She has appeared in 10 matches for Finland, including appearances at the 2019 and 2020 Cyprus Women's Cup as well as the UEFA Women's Euro 2022. She has previously played for Swedish club KIF Orebro and Finnish clubs Turun Palloseura and FC Honka.

She signed with National Women's Soccer League club Racing Louisville FC in December 2022.

References

External links
 
 

1999 births
Living people
Women's association football defenders
Finnish women's footballers
Finland women's international footballers
Expatriate women's footballers in Sweden
Finnish expatriate sportspeople in Sweden
Damallsvenskan players
Kansallinen Liiga players
Snowboarders at the 2016 Winter Youth Olympics
Finnish female snowboarders
Footballers from Turku
UEFA Women's Euro 2022 players